Uri Gordon (1935 – 2000) was an Israeli official and Zionist active in the return and resettlement of Ethiopian and Russian Jews in Israel during the 1980s and 1990s.

References

Further reading 

 

Israeli people
1935 births
2000 deaths
People from Tel Aviv
Zionist activists